Deems is a surname. Notable people with the surname include:

Barrett Deems (1914–1998), American jazz drummer
Charles Deems (1820–1893), American Christian clergyman
James Monroe Deems (1818–1901), American composer and music educator

See also
Deem